Panitsa is a rural locality (a village) in Ust-Vayengskoye Rural Settlement of Vinogradovsky District, Arkhangelsk Oblast, Russia. The population was 1 as of 2010.

Geography 
Panitsa is located 17 km north of Bereznik (the district's administrative centre) by road. Vysokusha is the nearest rural locality.

References 

Rural localities in Vinogradovsky District